Autosticha truncicola is a moth in the family Autostichidae. It was described by Ueda in 1997. It is found in China, Korea and Japan (Honshu, Kyushu).

The wingspan is 16–18 mm. Adults are similar to Autosticha opaca, but can be distinguished by the male and female genitalia.

The larvae feed on Sophora japonica, Robinica pseudoacacia and Prunus mume.

References

Moths described in 1997
Autosticha
Moths of Asia